This is a list of museums in Luxembourg.

Luxembourg City 
A Gadder
Abbey Museum
Am Tunnel 
Casino Luxembourg
European Museum Schengen
General Patton Museum
Industry and Railway Park Fond-de-Gras
Konschthal Esch
Kulturhuef Asbl
Luxembourgish Aviation Museum
Luxembourg City History Museum
Luxembourg Science Center
MNM Rumelange
MUDAM
Muerbelsmillen
Musée de l'Ardoise
Musée Automobile - Conservatoire National de Véhicules Historiques
Musée de la caricature
Musée Dräi Eechelen
Musee the Family of Man
Musée d'Histoire(s) Diekirch
Musée Littéraire 'Victor Hugo'
Musée A Possen
Musee Rural
Musée Rural Asbl
Musée Rural Binsfeld
Museum-Memorial of Deportation
National Audiovisual Centre
National Mining Museum, Luxembourg
National Museum of History and Art
National Museum of Military History (Luxembourg)
National Museum of Natural History (Luxembourg)
National Resistance Museum, Luxembourg
Photothèque (Luxembourg)
Prehistory Museum, Echternach
Rural and Artisanal Museum
Thillenvogtei
Tram and Bus Museum
Tudor Museum
Valentiny Foundation
Vianden City History Museum
Villa Vauban
Waassertuerm + Pomhouse
Wiltz Castle
Wine Museum, Ehnen

References 
Travel Luxembourg (warning, autoplays music)

See also 

 List of museums
 Tourism in Luxembourg
 Culture of Luxembourg

Museums
 
Luxembourg
Museums
Museums
Luxembourg